Abdul Rahim bin Thamby Chik (born 10 April 1950) is a Malaysian politician. He was the 6th Chief Minister of Malacca from 1982 to 1994. He is a former youth chief of the United Malays National Organisation (UMNO), a major component party of Barisan Nasional (BN) coalition. He was aligned with Dr. Mahathir Mohamed during the 1987 UMNO General Assembly. Presently he is an Independent politician due to his resignation from UMNO in 2018 and pending his application to join the Malaysian United Indigenous Party or Parti Pribumi Bersatu Malaysia (BERSATU), a component of the new Pakatan Harapan (PH) government coalition.

He is also the former Chairman of the Rubber Industry Smallholders Development Authority (RISDA) from 2010 to 2015.

Background
Rahim married Zabedah Abdullah and the couple have 4 children; Zetty Juyanty, Tutty Rahiza, Petty Diyana and Rahimy. Their eldest daughter, Zetty married the former TV3 personality, Kelvin Ong née Zahir Kelvin Ong Abdullah.

Education
Rahim received his primary school education at Sekolah Kebangsaan Pengkalan Balak, Masjid Tanah. Then he studied at Sekolah Menengah Kebangsaan Ghafar Baba, Malacca and Sekolah Menengah Datuk Seri Amar DiRaja, Muar, Johor. He continued his studies at University of Malaya (UM) and managed to graduate with Bachelor's degree of Applied Economy (1969-1973).

Controversies
In 1994 Rahim was initially charged with statutory rape of an underaged girl; however, the public prosecutor later withdrew the charge citing lack of evidence. He resigned as chief minister of Malacca and youth chief of UMNO amid allegations he had sexual relations with the 15-year-old girl. In 1995, Democratic Action Party (DAP) leader, Lim Guan Eng, who in the past had accused Rahim of raping the minor and had criticised the then-government for not acting against Rahim; was charged and sentenced to 18 months’ jail by the Melaka High Court for maliciously printing false news instead under the Printing Presses and Publications Act 1984 and under the Sedition Act 1948, but Lim was eventually released after 12 months.

In 1999, Anwar Ibrahim in one of four police reports he made; Tun H.S.Lee report 22517/99 dated 20 August 1999 had accused that the Prime Minister then Mahathir Mohamed, attorney-general Mohtar Abdullah and Senior Deputy Public Prosecutor Gani Patail for abuse of power to cover-up the corruption case involving Rahim. A copy of the report was also sent to the Badan Pencegah Rasuah (BPR) then.

On 21 March 2011, Rahim was one of the 'Datuk T' trio; together with Datuk Shazryl Eskay Abdullah and Datuk Shuib Lazim who screened a sex video at Bilik Seri Makmur, Hotel Carcosa Seri Negara; claiming it was of the opposition leader then Anwar Ibrahim allegedly engaging a prostitute to journalists which Anwar had denied the allegation. On 24 June 2011, they were charged and fined by Kuala Lumpur Magistrate Court for screening the sex video after they pleaded guilty.

Rahim was fined RM1,900 in default three months imprisonment by the Shah Alam Sessions Court on 20 September 2016, for making an offensive comment about Raja Muda of Selangor, Tengku Amir Shah on 25 September 2015. He also tendered a public apology to Selangor Ruler Sultan Sharafuddin Idris Shah and Tengku Amir, besides expressing remorse for his action. Rahim had earlier on 5 October 2015 claimed trial to an original charge of posting a seditious claim in his Facebook account that Tengku Amir was an apostate. However, the prosecution withdrew the charge after he pleaded guilty to the alternative charge.

Honours

Honours of Malaysia
  :
  Member of the Order of the Defender of the Realm (AMN) (1980)
  Commander of the Order of Loyalty to the Crown of Malaysia (PSM) – Tan Sri (1990)
  :
  Meritorious Service Medal (PJK)
  Grand Commander of the Exalted Order of Malacca (DGSM) – Datuk Seri (1984)
  :
  Knight Grand Companion of the Order of Sultan Salahuddin Abdul Aziz Shah (SSSA) – Dato' Seri (1989)
  :
  Knight Commander of the Order of the Star of Hornbill Sarawak (DA) – Datuk Amar (1988)
  :
 Knight Commander of the Order of the Crown of Johor (DPMJ) – Dato' (1983)

References

Living people
1950 births
People from Malacca
Malaysian people of Malay descent
Malaysian Muslims
Malaysian businesspeople
Former United Malays National Organisation politicians
Independent politicians in Malaysia
Members of the Dewan Rakyat
Members of the Malacca State Legislative Assembly
Malacca state executive councillors
Chief Ministers of Malacca
Commanders of the Order of Loyalty to the Crown of Malaysia
Knights Commander of the Order of the Star of Hornbill Sarawak
Knights Commander of the Order of the Crown of Johor
Members of the Order of the Defender of the Realm